This is a list of all personnel changes for the 1948 BAA off-season and 1948–49 BAA season.

Events

August 30, 1948
 The Boston Celtics sold Mike Bloom to the Minneapolis Lakers.

October ?, 1948
 The Chicago Stags sold Jim Seminoff to the Boston Celtics.

October 13, 1948
 The New York Knicks sold Stan Stutz to the Boston Celtics.

October 25, 1948
 The St. Louis Bombers sold Irv Rothenberg to the New York Knicks.

November 18, 1948
 The Philadelphia Warriors signed Elmore Morgenthaler as a free agent.

November 19, 1948
 The Boston Celtics signed Bob Doll as a free agent.
 The Baltimore Bullets traded John Mahnken to the Indianapolis Jets for Freddie Lewis and Hal Tidrick.

November 20, 1948
 The Chicago Stags sold Bill Roberts to the Boston Celtics.

December ?, 1948
 The Minneapolis Lakers released Mike Bloom.

December 1, 1948
 The Philadelphia Warriors sold Roy Pugh to the Fort Wayne Pistons.

December 2, 1948
 The Baltimore Bullets claimed Johnny Ezersky on waivers from the Providence Steam Rollers.

December 15, 1948
 The Philadelphia Warriors sold Bob O'Brien to the St. Louis Bombers.

December 19, 1948
 The Indianapolis Jets traded Bruce Hale and John Mahnken to the Fort Wayne Pistons for Ralph Hamilton, Walt Kirk and Blackie Towery.

December 21, 1948
 The Rochester Royals sold Lionel Malamed to the Indianapolis Jets.

December 28, 1948
 The Washington Capitols waived Jack Toomay.

January ?, 1949
 The St. Louis Bombers sold Giff Roux to the Providence Steam Rollers.
 The Baltimore Bullets signed Jack Toomay as a free agent.
 The Providence Steam Rollers released Earl Shannon.

January 2, 1949
 Red Auerbach resigns as Head Coach for Washington Capitols.

January 16, 1949
 The Boston Celtics traded Chick Halbert and Mel Riebe to the Providence Steam Rollers for George Nostrand.

January 21, 1949
 The Boston Celtics signed Earl Shannon as a free agent.

January 26, 1949
 The Indianapolis Jets traded Ray Lumpp to the New York Knicks for Tommy Byrnes and cash.

January 27, 1949
 The Philadelphia Warriors sold Phil Farbman to the Boston Celtics.

January 28, 1949
 The Chicago Stags signed Mike Bloom as a free agent.

January 30, 1949
 The Fort Wayne Pistons sold Bob Kinney to the Boston Celtics.

February ?, 1949
 The Boston Celtics claimed Johnny Ezersky on waivers from the Baltimore Bullets.

February 3, 1949
 The Indianapolis Jets traded Charlie Black to the Fort Wayne Pistons for Leo Mogus and cash.

February 4, 1949
 The Chicago Stags signed Carl Meinhold as a free agent.
 The Chicago Stags sold Bill Miller to the St. Louis Bombers.

February 5, 1949
 The Baltimore Bullets sold Irv Torgoff to the Philadelphia Warriors.

February 7, 1949
 The Chicago Stags sold Whitey Kachan to the Minneapolis Lakers.
 The Providence Steam Rollers traded Otto Schnellbacher to the St. Louis Bombers for Buddy O'Grady.

February 11, 1949
 The St. Louis Bombers released Don Martin.
 The Baltimore Bullets signed Don Martin as a free agent.
 The New York Knicks traded Sid Tanenbaum to the Baltimore Bullets for Connie Simmons. Simmons was sent as the player to be named later in July 1949.

May ?, 1949
 The Indianapolis Jets sold Tommy Byrnes to the New York Knicks.

June 22, 1949
 The Boston Celtics sold Gene Stump to the Minneapolis Lakers.

Notes
 Number of years played in the BAA prior to the draft
 Career with the franchise that drafted the player
 Never played a game for the franchise

External links
BAA Transactions at NBA.com
1948-49 BAA Transactions| Basketball-Reference.com

References

Transactions
1948-49